Kruisstraat is a hamlet in the Dutch province of North Brabant.

References

Populated places in North Brabant
Roosendaal